Jesús Arturo Barajas López (born 17 March 2000) is a Mexican badminton player.

Achievements

BWF International Challenge/Series 
Men's doubles

  BWF International Challenge tournament
  BWF International Series tournament
  BWF Future Series tournament

References

External links 
 

2000 births
Living people
Mexican male badminton players
21st-century Mexican people